is an action game in the Tales series of games. published by Bandai Namco Games. It is considered a spinoff, and plays similarly to the Dynasty Warriors series. The game was released for the PlayStation Portable in Japan on February 23, 2012.

Gameplay
The game plays similarly to the Dynasty Warriors video game series. The premise of the game is to control characters from past Tales video games, and use them to fight large waves of enemies. In addition to using past game's protagonists, it is also possible to fight against past game's antagonists, and even unlock some to be played as in game.

Equipping items gives characters different statistics. Some special items even change appearance, such as giving character models a super deformed look with especially big heads.

Development
A demo for the game was made available for the Japanese PlayStation Network on January 26, 2012. After the game's release, there was downloadable content for the game, in the form of new missions to play, but not through the PlayStation Store, but rather, a special Tales-related website.

Characters
Heroes

Villains

Reception and sales
The game topped the Japanese video game sales charts in its first week, selling 85,000 copies. However, these sales only represented a 69.47% sell-through rate for the game, and the game sold significantly less than recent spinoff Tales titles on the PlayStation Portable, such as 2009's Tales of VS. at 133,076 copies sold. Media Create felt this was due to the game containing less character interaction than most Tales games, and that some retailers had reported less interest from women as well.

The game received a score of 31/40 (8/7/8/8) from ''Famitsu.

References

External links
Official website

2012 video games
Action video games
Crossover beat 'em ups
Japan-exclusive video games
Namco beat 'em ups
Alfa System games
PlayStation Portable games
PlayStation Portable-only games
Graces, Tales of
Video games developed in Japan
Video games scored by Go Shiina
Video games scored by Motoi Sakuraba